The 2016 HappyBet Cup was a summer football friendly tournament organized by Alemannia Aachen, La Liga and Match IQ. It was hosted on 24 July 2016 by Alemannia Aachen at the New Tivoli in Aachen. Köln (Germany), Málaga (Spain) and Marseille (France) participated in the tournament along with the hosts, Alemannia. It was sponsored by HappyBet.

Overview

Participants

Standings
All matches will last for just 45 minutes. If a match is level after normal time then a penalty shoot-out will decide who advances.

Bracket

Matches
All matches lasted 45 minutes.

Semi-finals

Third place play-off

Final

Goalscorers

Media coverage

References

External links 

2016–17 in French football
2016–17 in German football
2016–17 in Spanish football
July 2016 sports events in Germany